Arnulf Olsen (born 13 October 1928) is a former Norwegian politician for the Labour Party.

Hailing from Hammerfest, he was a member of Finnmark county council from 1975 to 1983. During the entire period he served as county mayor. He was also mayor of Hammerfest in 1975–1979 and 1983–1987.

References

Bibliography

1928 births
Living people
Labour Party (Norway) politicians
Mayors of Hammerfest
Chairmen of County Councils of Norway
People from Hammerfest